The 2015–16 Florida A&M Rattlers basketball team represented Florida A&M University during the 2015–16 NCAA Division I men's basketball season. The Rattlers, led by second year head coach Byron Samuels, played their home games at the Teaching Gym and were members of the Mid-Eastern Athletic Conference. The Rattlers finished the season 8–21, 4–12 in MEAC play to finish in last place. Due to failing to meet APR requirements, the Rattlers were banned from postseason play including the MEAC tournament.

Roster

Schedule

|-
!colspan=9 style="background:#; color:white;"|  Regular season

References

Florida A&M Rattlers basketball seasons
Florida AandM